These are the results of the rhythmic group all-around competition, one of the two events of the rhythmic gymnastics discipline contested in the gymnastics at the 1996 Summer Olympics in Atlanta. The women's rhythmic group all-around was contested for the first time at these Games.

Qualification

Nine teams participated in the first round. The top six teams would go on to the final round.

Final

References

 http://www.gymnasticsresults.com/olympics/og1996rg.html

Women's rhythmic group all-around
1996
1996 in women's gymnastics
Women's events at the 1996 Summer Olympics